Landa bazaar is a bazaar (marketplace) in Lahore, Pakistan where secondhand general goods are exchanged or sold.

References 

Retail markets in Pakistan